Werner von Orseln (c. 1280 – 18 November 1330) was the 17th Grand Master of the Teutonic Order, serving from 1324 to 1330.

Von Orseln hailed from a noble family of vogts (reeves) of the Counts of Falkenstein in Oberursel near Frankfurt. It is not known when he joined the Teutonic Order. He is first mentioned in 1312 holding the office of a Komtur at the Ordensburg of Ragnit (present-day Neman) near the border of the Order State with the Grand Duchy of Lithuania. In 1314, Grand Master Karl von Trier appointed von Orseln Grand Komtur at Malbork Castle. During a coup d'etat in the Monastic State, he supported the Grand Master and was exiled along with him. However, he returned in 1319 and he held the position of von Trier's resident in Prussia. He negotiated discussion and restored hierarchic discipline within the Order.

Upon the death of Karl von Trier, the Order's capitulum on 6 July 1324 chose von Orseln as the next Grand Master. Immediately after being elected, von Orseln was forced to start negotiations with King Władysław I the Elbow-high of Poland over the contested lands of Pomerelia, which the Knights had annexed after the takeover of Gdańsk in 1308. The discussions did not produce any results, however, and the Teutonic Order started preparations for war with Poland. In 1326 the Grand Master formed an anti-Polish coalition at Brodnica, consisting of the Masovian dukes Siemowit II, Trojden I and Wenceslaus of Płock as well as of several Silesian Piasts and King John of Bohemia. The pretext to start the Polish–Teutonic War gave King Władysław I by the invasion of Płock in 1327. In retaliation, the Grand Master ordered the conquest of Polish Kujavia and Dobrzyń Land.

Yet during the war, von Orseln died at Marienburg Castle as a result of several wounds after an assassination attempt by a mad knight, allegedly Johan von Endorf. He was buried in the cathedral of Marienwerder (Kwidzyn). There is, however, some doubt that it was Endorf, who was convicted three days later and sentenced to jail for life.

As the superior of the Order, von Orseln paid special attention to spiritual life. Despite the ongoing war with Poland, he was able to organize two assemblies of the Prussian clergy and issue several administrative acts forming the base of the political system of the state for decades.

References

1280 births
1330 deaths
People from Hochtaunuskreis
Grand Masters of the Teutonic Order